Ronald "Roly" Crichton  is a New Zealand para-swimmer and coach. At the 1984 Summer Paralympics, he won a gold medal in the 50m Freestyle 2, silver medals in the 200m Freestyle 2 and 25m Butterfly 2, and a bronze medal in the 100m Individual Medley 2. At the 1988 Summer Paralympics, he won a silver medal in the 200m Freestyle 2 and a bronze medal in the 50m Freestyle 2.

Crichton is the former coach of para-swimmer Sophie Pascoe, and in the 2019 New Year Honours, he was made an Officer of the New Zealand Order of Merit for services to Paralympic sport.

References

External links 
 
 

Living people
Year of birth missing (living people)
Officers of the New Zealand Order of Merit
Paralympic swimmers of New Zealand
New Zealand swimming coaches
Swimmers at the 1984 Summer Paralympics
Swimmers at the 1988 Summer Paralympics
Paralympic gold medalists for New Zealand
Paralympic silver medalists for New Zealand
Paralympic bronze medalists for New Zealand
Medalists at the 1984 Summer Paralympics
Medalists at the 1988 Summer Paralympics
Paralympic medalists in swimming
New Zealand male freestyle swimmers